Bower Place (also known as Bower Place Shopping Centre) is a shopping centre located in Red Deer, Alberta, Canada.

It has more than 120 stores and services including Hudson's Bay, H&M, Toys "R" Us and Shoppers Drug Mart. The mall underwent a $55 million redevelopment that commenced in September 2004 and was completed in August 2009.

The mall underwent another renovation of a former Target Canada location following the company's bankruptcy and vacating (it had previously been a Zeller's location). The renovated and expanded wing opened in December 2019, with Marshalls and Shoppers Drug Mart as anchor tenants. The mall had a major anchor vacancy in the former Sears Canada location, which closed in 2018 until Motion Fitness took over the vacant space in 2022.

Anchors
Hudson's Bay 
H&M
Shoppers Drug Mart
Toys "R" Us
Marshalls
Motion Fitness
Sunterra Market

References

External links
Bower Place

Shopping malls in Alberta
Buildings and structures in Red Deer, Alberta
Shopping malls established in 1981
1981 establishments in Alberta